Mattéo Tramoni (born 20 January 2000) is a French professional footballer who plays as a midfielder for  club Pisa.

Club career
Tramoni made his professional debut for AC Ajaccio in a 3–0 Ligue 2 win against Valenciennes FC on 19 September 2017, at the age of 17. He scored his first professional goal in a 2–0 win over Football Bourg-en-Bresse Péronnas 01 on 29 September 2017.

On 1 July 2021, he joined Brescia on loan.

On 18 August 2022, Tramoni moved to Pisa, signing a four-year contract with the Tuscan club.

Personal life
Tramoni is the older brother of the footballer Lisandru Tramoni.

References

External links
 
 
 
 
 

2000 births
Living people
Sportspeople from Ajaccio
Association football midfielders
French footballers
France youth international footballers
AC Ajaccio players
Cagliari Calcio players
Brescia Calcio players
Pisa S.C. players
Ligue 2 players
Serie A players
Serie B players
French expatriate footballers
French expatriate sportspeople in Italy
Expatriate footballers in Italy
Footballers from Corsica